Christy Sutherland (born April 9, 1973) is an American, Nashville country music and praise/worship singer-songwriter. Signed to Epic Records in 2004, she charted the single "Freedom" on the Hot Country Songs charts. She is married to Kenneth Matthew Dudney, son of Country music star, Barbara Mandrell. The two were wed on July 14, 2006, during a private ceremony at Mandrell's home. Dudney currently works as tour and business manager for Sutherland.

On July 2, 2010, Sutherland helped host the 2010 Diamond Awards and was voted Christian Country Female Vocalist of the Year. Sutherland wrote and sang the song, Greater Still with Jason Crabb. The song won the 2012 AMG Heritage Award for song of the year.

Singles

References

Living people
American women country singers
American country singer-songwriters
Epic Records artists
1976 births
People from Port Lavaca, Texas
21st-century American singers
21st-century American women singers
Country musicians from Texas
Singer-songwriters from Texas